Alexander Krysanov (born 2 January 1981) is a Russian retired professional ice hockey forward who played for Amur Khabarovsk in the Kontinental Hockey League.

References

External links

1981 births
Living people
Amur Khabarovsk players
HC CSKA Moscow players
Russian ice hockey right wingers
Torpedo Nizhny Novgorod players
Sportspeople from Voronezh